Debendra Thapa (born 26 June 1977), also called Debind Thapa, is a Nepalese former professional boxer who competed from 1998 to 2006. He challenged twice for the WBC-NABF super flyweight title in 2001 and the WBC-NABF super bantamweight title in 2003. As an amateur, he competed for India in the men's light flyweight event at the 1996 Summer Olympics. He also won a gold medal at the 1995 South Asian Games.

Professional boxing record

References

External links
 

1977 births
Living people
Indian male boxers
Olympic boxers of India
Boxers at the 1996 Summer Olympics
Nepalese male boxers
Southpaw boxers
People from Syangja District
Super-bantamweight boxers
Super-flyweight boxers
Light-flyweight boxers